Nordine Mahieddine (born 11 December 1989) is an Algerian-French kickboxer, currently competing in the heavyweight division of Glory. Between July 2021 and September 2022, Mahieddine was ranked as a top ten heavyweight according to Combat Press.

Professional kickboxing career

Early career
Mahieddine made his professional debut against Issam Reghi at Kickboxing Championnat D'Europe on December 19, 2008. He won the fight by decision. He would go on to amass a 12–5 record, mostly competing on the French circuit, before beginning to compete in European tournaments.

Mahieddine faced Bas Vorstenbosch in the semifinals of the K1 Event 8 heavyweight tournament, held on February 20, 2016. He beat Bas by decision. He won the tournament with a decision victory against Abderhamane Coulibaly in the tournament finals.

Mahieddine was scheduled to face Marco Manetti at Boxe Evenements 13 on March 26, 2016. He won the fight by a first-round knockout.

Mahieddine took part in the Partouche Kickboxing Tour heavyweight tournament, held on July 22, 2016. He was scheduled to face Farid Nair in the tournament semifinals. It was the third overall meeting between the two, with Mahieddine both of their previous fights. Mahieddine was as successful in their third encounter as he was in the first two, winning by a first-round knockout. He fought Dragos Zubco in the finals, and won by a third-round knockout.

Mahieddine made his Glory debut against Nicolas Wamba at Glory 35: Nice on November 5, 2016. Wamba won the fight by decision.

Mahieddine fought Saša Polugić for the WAKO European Heavyweight title at XI eme Trophée Des Etoiles on April 8, 2017. He won the fight by a third-round knockout.

Mahieddine was scheduled to face Peter Aerts at the April 23, 2017 event. Aerts won the fight by decision.

Mahieddine was scheduled to fight Daniel Sam at Capital Fights 2 on May 20, 2017. Sam won the fight by decision.

Mahieddine fought Tarik Khbabez at the October 29, 2017, event. Khbabez won the fight by decision.

Mahieddine was scheduled to face Roman Kryklia at the November 25, 2017 NDC event. Kryklia won the fight by decision.

Mahieddine took part in the 2018 World Fighting League heavyweight tournament, held on September 22, 2018, and was scheduled to face Fred Sikking in the quarterfinals. He beat Sikking by decision, and beat Andrei Stoica in the semifinals in the same manner. Mahieddine lost to Murat Aygün in the tournament finals by decision.

Glory
Mahieddine made his second appearance with the promotion against Antonio Plazibat at Glory 66: Paris on June 22, 2019. Plazibat won the fight by unanimous decision.

Mahieddine was scheduled to face Kiril Kornilov at Glory 70: Lyon on October 26, 2019. He won the fight by unanimous decision.

Mahieddine was scheduled to fight Cihad Kepenek at Glory Collision 2 on December 21, 2019. He won the fight by split decision, after an extra round was fought.

Mahieddine participated in a four-man, one night tournament at Glory 76: Rotterdam on December 19, 2020. He fought a rematch with Antonio Plazibat in the semifinals, while the other semifinal pairing consisted of Levi Rigters and Marciano Bhagwandass. Mahieddine beat Plazibat by a close split decision, after an extra round was fought, and faced Rigters in the tournament finals. Rigters won the fight by a first-round knockout.

Mahieddine was scheduled to face Raul Cătinaș at Glory 78: Arnhem on September 4, 2021. He won the fight by unanimous decision.

Mahieddine was booked to rematch Cihad Kepenek at Glory 81: Ben Saddik vs. Adegbuyi 2 on August 20, 2022. He lost the fight by a first-round knockout. The result was overturned to a no contest on November 24, as Kepenek tested positive for a banned substance.

Mahieddine made his light heavyweight debut against Felipe Micheletti at Glory 84 on March 11, 2023. He lost the fight by unanimous decision.

Championships and accomplishments
2017 WAKO European Heavyweight Championship

Kickboxing record

|-  bgcolor="#fbb"
| 2023-03-11 || Loss ||align=left| Felipe Micheletti || Glory 84 || Rotterdam, Netherlands || Decision (Unanimous) || 3 || 3:00 || 27–15 (1)
|-

|-  bgcolor="#c5d2ea"
| 2022-08-20 || NC|| align="left" | Cihad Kepenek || Glory 81: Ben Saddik vs. Adegbuyi 2 || Düsseldorf, Germany || No Contest || 1 || 2:52 || 27–14 (1)
|-
! style=background:white colspan=9 |
|-  bgcolor="#cfc"
| 2021-09-04 || Win || align="left" | Raul Cătinaș || Glory 78: Rotterdam || Rotterdam, Netherlands || Decision (Unanimous) || 3 || 3:00 || 27–14
|-  bgcolor="#fbb"
| 2020-12-19 || Loss ||align=left| Levi Rigters || Glory 76: Rotterdam, Tournament Final || Rotterdam, Netherlands || KO (Front kick) || 1 || 1:49 || 26–14
|-
|-  bgcolor="#cfc"
| 2020-12-19 || Win ||align=left| Antonio Plazibat || Glory 76: Rotterdam, Tournament Semifinal || Rotterdam, Netherlands || Ext. R Decision (Split) || 4 || 3:00 || 26–13
|-
|-  bgcolor="#cfc"
| 2019-12-21 || Win ||align=left| Cihad Kepenek || Glory Collision 2 || Arnhem, Netherlands || Ext. R Decision (Split) || 4 || 3:00 || 25–13
|-
|-  bgcolor="#cfc"
| 2019-10-26 || Win ||align=left| Kiril Kornilov || Glory 70: Lyon || Lyon, France|| Decision (Unanimous) || 3 || 3:00 || 24–13
|-
|-  bgcolor="#fbb"
| 2019-06-22 || Loss ||align=left| Antonio Plazibat || Glory 66: Paris || Paris, France|| Decision (Unanimous) || 3 || 3:00 || 23–13
|-
|-  bgcolor="#fbb"
| 2018-09-22 || Loss ||align=left| Murat Aygün || World Fighting League, Tournament Final || Almere, Netherlands || Decision || 3 || 3:00 || 20–12
|-
|-  bgcolor="#cfc"
| 2018-09-22 || Win ||align=left| Andrei Stoica || World Fighting League, Tournament Semifinal || Almere, Netherlands || Decision (split) || 3 || 3:00 || 20–11
|-
|-  bgcolor="#cfc"
| 2018-09-22 || Win ||align=left| Fred Sikking || World Fighting League, Tournament Quarterfinal || Almere, Netherlands || Decision || 3 || 3:00 || 19–11
|-
|-  bgcolor="#fbb"
| 2017-11-25 || Loss ||align=left| Roman Kryklia || Nuit Des Champions || Marseille, France || Decision || 3 || 3:00 || 18–11
|-
|-  bgcolor="#fbb"
| 2017-10-29 || Loss ||align=left| Tarik Khbabez || World Fighting League || Almere, Netherlands|| Decision || 3 || 3:00 || 18–10
|-
|-  bgcolor="#fbb"
| 2017-05-20 || Loss ||align=left| Daniel Sam || Capital Fights 2 || Paris, France || Decision || 3 || 3:00 || 18–9
|-
|-  bgcolor="#fbb"
| 2017-04-23 || Loss ||align=left| Peter Aerts || World Fighting League || Almere, Netherlands || Decision || 3 || 3:00 || 18–8
|-
|-  bgcolor="#cfc"
| 2017-04-08|| Win ||align=left| Saša Polugić || XI eme Trophée Des Etoiles || Gardanne, France || KO || 3 ||  || 18–7
|-
|-  bgcolor="#fbb"
| 2016-11-05|| Loss ||align=left| Nicolas Wamba || Glory 35: Nice || Nice, France || Decision (Unanimous) || 3 || 3:00 || 17–7
|-
|-  bgcolor="#cfc"
| 2016-07-22 || Win ||align=left| Dragoș Zubco || Partouche Kickboxing Tour, Tournament Final || La Grande-Motte, France || KO || 1 ||  || 17–6
|- 
! style=background:white colspan=9 |
|-  bgcolor="#cfc"
| 2016-07-22 || Win ||align=left| Farid Nair || Partouche Kickboxing Tour, Tournament Semifinal || La Grande-Motte, France || KO || 1 ||  || 16–6
|-
|-  bgcolor="#cfc"
| 2016-03-26 || Win ||align=left| Marco Manetti || Boxe Evenements 13 || La Fare-les-Oliviers, France || KO|| 1 ||  || 15–6
|-
|-  bgcolor="#cfc"
| 2016-02-20 || Win ||align=left| Abderhamane Coulibaly || K1 Event 8, Tournament Final || Troyes, France || Decision || 3 || 3:00 || 14–6
|- 
! style=background:white colspan=9 |
|-  bgcolor="#cfc"
| 2016-02-20 || Win ||align=left| Bas Vorstenbosch  || K1 Event 8, Tournament Semifinal || Troyes, France || Decision || 3 || 3:00 || 13–6
|-
|-  bgcolor="#fbb"
| 2015-02-21 || Loss ||align=left| Fabrice Aurieng || Stars Night || Vitrolles, Bouches-du-Rhône, France || TKO || 3 ||  || 12–6
|-
|-  bgcolor="#fbb"
| 2014-10-25 || Loss ||align=left| Volkan Oezdemir || SUPERKOMBAT World Grand Prix Final Elimination || Geneva, Switzerland || Decision (majority) || 3 || 3:00 || 12–5
|-
|-  bgcolor="#cfc"
| 2014-04-26 || Win||align=left| Gaetan Sautron || Trophée Etoiles VIII || Aix-en-Provence, France || Decision || 3 || 3:00 || 12–4
|-
|-  bgcolor="#cfc"
| 2013-06-15|| Win||align=left| Andrey Gerasimchuk || The Battle of Saint-Raphael || Saint-Raphaël, Var, France || Decision || 3 || 3:00 || 11–4
|-
|-  bgcolor="#fbb"
| 2013-05-18 || Loss ||align=left| Arnold Oborotov || Urban Boxing United 2013 || Marseille, France || KO || 2 || || 10–4
|-
|-  bgcolor="#cfc"
| 2013-01-26 || Win ||align=left|  Mohamed Benyaich || Stars night || Vitrolles, Bouches-du-Rhône, France || KO || 2 || || 10–3
|-
|-  bgcolor="#cfc"
| 2012-12-15 || Win ||align=left| Farid Nair || Championnat du Monde K1 rules || Saint-Raphaël, Var, France || KO|| 2 || || 9–3
|-
|-  bgcolor="#cfc"
| 2012-10-27 || Win ||align=left| Farid Nair || F-1 World Max Tournament 2012 || Meyreuil, France || Decision || 3 || || 8–3
|-
|-  bgcolor="#cfc"
| 2012-05-19 || Win ||align=left| Noël Cadet || Urban Boxing United 2012 || Marseille, France || KO || 1 || || 7–3
|-
|-  bgcolor="#cfc"
| 2011-06-18 || Win ||align=left| Giusepe Alicata || Grand Gala De Boxe || Grasse, France || KO || 2 || || 6–3
|-
|-  bgcolor="#fbb"
| 2011-05-27 || Loss ||align=left| Fabrice Aurieng || K1 Rules Tournament X || Marseille, France || Decision (Unanimous) || 3 || 3:00 || 5–3
|-
|-  bgcolor="#cfc"
| 2011-05-07 || Win ||align=left| Cyril Assentio || Urban Boxing United 2011 || Marseille, France || TKO (Doctor stoppage) || 1 ||  || 5–2
|-
|-  bgcolor="#fbb"
| 2011-03-19|| Loss ||align=left| Nicolas Wamba || 8ème Trophée de l'Ephèbe || Agde, France || TKO (Doctor stoppage) || 4 ||  || 4–2
|-
|-  bgcolor="#cfc"
| 2010-07-16|| Win||align=left| Brahim Bagdadi || All Stars || Saint-Raphaël, Var, France || TKO (Referee stoppage) || 4 ||  || 4–1
|-
|-  bgcolor="#fbb"
| 2010-05-08|| Loss ||align=left| Stéphane Susperregui || Championnat De France K1 || Montélimar, France || Decision (Unanimous) || 3 || 3:00 || 3–1
|- 
! style=background:white colspan=9 |
|-  bgcolor="#cfc"
| 2010-04-24 || Win||align=left| Joachim Tomas || La Nuit Des Titans || Saint-André-les-Vergers, France || Decision (Unanimous) || 3 || 3:00 || 3–0
|-
|-  bgcolor="#cfc"
| 2010-01-29 || Win||align=left| Sofiane Azi || KICK TOURNAMENT || Marseille, France || TKO ||  ||  || 2–0
|-
|-  bgcolor="#cfc"
| 2008-12-19 || Win||align=left| Issam Reghi || Kickboxing Championnat D'Europe || Marseille, France || Decision || 3 || 3:00 || 1–0
|-
|-
| colspan=9 | Legend:

See also
 List of male kickboxers

References

Living people
French male kickboxers
Algerian male kickboxers
Heavyweight kickboxers
Sportspeople from Marseille
1989 births
Glory kickboxers
SUPERKOMBAT kickboxers
French sportspeople of Algerian descent